William Henry Hohman (November 27, 1903 – October 29, 1968) was an American professional baseball player who played in seven games for the Philadelphia Phillies during the  season.
He was born in Brooklyn, Maryland and died at the age of 64 in Baltimore, Maryland.

External links

Baseball players from Baltimore
Philadelphia Phillies players
Frederick Hustlers players
1903 births
1968 deaths
Easton Farmers players